Defending champion Casper Ruud defeated Matteo Berrettini in the final, 4–6, 7–6(7–4), 6–2 to win the singles tennis title at the 2022 Swiss Open Gstaad.

The semifinal lineup comprised Ruud, Berrettini, Albert Ramos Viñolas, and Dominic Thiem. All four players were former Gstaad champions (Ruud in 2021, Berrettini in 2018, Ramos Viñolas in 2019, and Thiem in 2015), marking the first ATP Tour tournament where all four semifinalists were former champions since the 2010 Rogers Cup.

Seeds
The top four seeds receive a bye into the second round.

Draw

Finals

Top half

Bottom half

Qualifying

Seeds

Qualifiers

Qualifying draw

First qualifier

Second qualifier

Third qualifier

Fourth qualifier

References

External links
 Main draw
 Qualifying draw

2022 ATP Tour
2022 Singles